Ruling T-260/12 refers to a constitutional action for the protection of fundamental rights, hereinafter referred to as Tutela, decided by the Constitutional Court of Colombia. It is a landmark decision in the protection of the fundamental rights of children in connection with the use of social networks.

In protecting a child's rights to data privacy and honour, the court ordered the immediate closure of a Facebook account that was opened by a father in the name of his child. Because the case involves a minor, no details of her identity are mentioned in the ruling. The child is referred as XX, the mother of the child as AA and the father as BB.

The Claim
In 2011, AA filed a Tutela action for the protection of the fundamental rights of intimacy and free development of personality, in representation of her 4-year-old daughter, XX. According to AA, these rights were violated by BB, father of XX, who opened a Facebook account in the name of XX. AA considered that XX did not have sufficient maturity to use a social network.

According to AA, BB used false information to open the Facebook account; he listed the birth year as 1974 whereas XX was born in 2007. AA considered that BB violated the terms and conditions of Facebook when creating the profile of XX, by providing false information and creating an account in the name of a third person.

Answer to the claim
BB confirmed that XX had a Facebook account, identified as such only with 24 family members. BB argued that, as father of the child, he decided to open the account to have a photo album of the child's life, as it was the only effective way to obtain and download pictures of his daughter. According to BB, there were long periods of time in which he had to be away from his daughter, due to the actions of AA.

Regarding the violation of Facebook terms and conditions, BB affirmed that he had the child's custody and, therefore, the right to act on her behalf with the purpose of preserving her family ties. BB affirmed that the child was not a Facebook user; BB was the only one using the account on her behalf, in an inoffensive manner.

Decision of the First Court of Cartao
In the first instance, the First Court of Cartago, Valle del Cauca, Colombia, denied the Tutela action. The First Court considered that there was no violation of fundamental rights, as BB's actions only demonstrated his love for his daughter.

Review by the Constitutional Court of Colombia
This case was selected for review by the Constitutional Court of Colombia which considered that BB's actions, by opening the Facebook account in the name of his daughter, violated XX's fundamental rights to data privacy and honour. It ordered the immediate cancellation of the Facebook account in the name of the child. This decision was based on the special protection of children's rights due to their vulnerability (physical and mental immaturity) and the need to guarantee their integral development. According to the Constitution, children's rights prevail over others' rights and are subject to a reinforced protection.

Habeas data / Data privacy
Habeas data is understood as the right of individuals to authorize the access and demand the inclusion, exclusion, correction, addition, update and certification of personal data. The purpose of Habeas Data is to protect personal information in a globalized world, in which the access to information is fundamental to peoples’ lives. The protection of this right is key because it is related to the exercise of other fundamental rights such as intimacy, good name and honour.

In the digital information era, where social networks are increasingly used for sharing, communicating and entertaining, citizens' fundamental rights can be at risk. The creation of accounts that reveal data and personal information may lead to a violation of the right to intimacy, privacy, image and honour. The risk is caused by the user's lack of knowledge regarding the terms and conditions of social networks, and the possible uses of the information by third parties.

The risks may be more harmful to children's rights because they do not understand the risks of exposure through social media, including access to information which is inappropriate for their age and contact with malicious people. These risks may affect children's growth and development.

XX case

The Court highlighted that the case should be decided in accordance with applicable constitutional norms and the possible violation of fundamental rights, and not in consideration of the terms and conditions provided by Facebook. There is no specific norm that regulates the use of the social networks by children in Colombia. Nevertheless, children's rights have a superior interest. In the case of a 4-year-old, the child does not have the age and maturity to consent to the terms and conditions of a social network such as Facebook. XX was not aware of the existence of the Facebook account created by her father. In the moment that XX has the capacity of participating in a social network, she will find information about herself that was published without her consent. Therefore, the use of the child's information without her consent in Facebook, affects the XX's fundamental right of data privacy.

The existence of a Facebook account in the name of XX affects her right to honour, as her intimate details could be exposed without her consent. Moreover, she will be “friends” with people she didn't choose, even if they are family. The information included in the account could affect how third parties perceive XX, when she may prefer to disclose her personal information in a different way.

The Court stated that child custody issues may not take precedence over a child's fundamental rights, as in this case, where there is a violation of the child's rights to data privacy and honour. Therefore, XX's rights should be protected as she never consented to the creation of a Facebook account. This does not mean that children may not have access to social media and technologies, with the proper guidance. The Constitutional Court warned BB that he may not create another social network account in the name of his daughter, or one that includes information about her.

Magistrate Luis Ernesto Vargas Silva clarified his vote by explaining that the primary violation was over the free development of personality, even if there were a violation of habeas data. He considered that the Court based its position on eventual possible facts and not over real facts. XX had not been granted the right to fully develop her personality and decide for herself something that may be relevant in her growing process.

Comments on the decision
This is a leading decision as it is the first case regarding children's rights with respect to social networks to be decided by a higher court in Colombia. While some of the considerations of the Court may be a reiteration of jurisprudence, what it is important about the case is how such considerations were applied in the context of the use of a social network, as Facebook, and how such use may affect the rights of a child.

References

Sources
 Sentencia T-260/12 (2012) Corte Constitucional de Colombia. Principio del interes superior del menor. Corteconstitucional.gov.co, Magistrado Ponente: Humberto Antonio Sierra Porto. Retrieved October 26, 2016. 

Constitutional Court of Colombia